Hannes Björninen (born 19 October 1995) is a Finnish professional ice hockey forward for Brynäs IF of the Swedish Hockey League (SHL).

Playing career
Björninen made his Liiga debut playing with Lahti Pelicans during the 2014–15 season.

Following his third season as captain and seventh overall with the Lahti Pelicans, Björninen left as a free agent and signed a two-year contract with Finnish Kontinental Hockey League competitors, Jokerit, on 5 May 2021. In the 2021–22 season, Björninen posted 10 goals and 21 points through 43 regular season games with Jokerit before the club's withdrawal to the KHL prior to the playoffs in the due to the Russian invasion of Ukraine. He subsequently returned his original Finnish club, Pelicans of the Liiga, for the remainder of the campaign.

On 28 April 2022, Björninen left the Liiga and the Pelicans for the second season in succession, agreeing to a two-year contract with Swedish SHL club, Brynäs IF.

International play

Björninen played for Team Finland at the 2022 Winter Olympics, scoring the winning goal in the Gold Medal Game and bringing gold to Finland for the first time.

Career statistics

Regular season and playoffs

International

References

External links

1995 births
Living people
Brynäs IF players
Finnish ice hockey forwards
Jokerit players
Lahti Pelicans players
Ice hockey players at the 2022 Winter Olympics
Olympic ice hockey players of Finland
Medalists at the 2022 Winter Olympics
Olympic gold medalists for Finland
Olympic medalists in ice hockey
Sportspeople from Lahti